Kozlovo is a rural locality (a selo) and the administrative center of Kozlovsky Selsoviet of Volodarsky District, Astrakhan Oblast, Russia. The population was 1,834 as of 2010. There are 10 streets.

Geography 
Kozlovo is located 3 km northeast of Volodarsky (the district's administrative centre) by road. Paromny is the nearest rural locality.

References 

Rural localities in Volodarsky District, Astrakhan Oblast